Manuel Moix is a Spanish lawyer. After serving as a public prosecutor in the Community of Madrid, he was appointed Spain's "top anti-corruption prosecutor" from February 2017.
He resigned on 1 June 2017, after admitting he owned 25% of a Panamanian offshore company.

Moix and his siblings owned an offshore company in Panama, which was apparently inherited from their parents. The company, Duchesse Financial Overseas, was set up in 1988, and in 1990 bought a luxury villa near Madrid worth approximately €550,000.

Moix also received criticism for other issues. He is alleged to have attempted to interfere in corruption investigations, including the "Lezo Case", involving the governing People's Party.

References

Living people
20th-century Spanish lawyers
Spanish prosecutors
1958 births
21st-century Spanish lawyers